The George Albert Smith Fieldhouse is a 5,000 seat multi-purpose arena in Provo, Utah. Built in 1951, it is the home of the Brigham Young University Cougars volleyball teams and most home gymnastics meets. It was named for George Albert Smith, the eighth president of the Church of Jesus Christ of Latter-day Saints, who died the year the fieldhouse opened.  Prior to the Marriott Center opening in 1971 it was home to the basketball teams.  At that time, the arena held 10,500 people. Smith Fieldhouse also has a track and several offices used by BYU's athletic department.

The Smith Fieldhouse hosted the 2009 NCAA Men's Volleyball Championship.  It held the first round of the NCAA Men's Division I Basketball Championship twice, in 1960 and 1970, and the West Regionals in 1962, 1963 and 1965.

References

External links
Smith Fieldhouse seating chart via BYU Tickets

Basketball venues in Utah
BYU Cougars basketball venues
College gymnastics venues in the United States
College volleyball venues in the United States
Defunct college basketball venues in the United States
Sports venues in Utah County, Utah
Brigham Young University buildings
Sports venues completed in 1951
1951 establishments in Utah